The Manial Palace and Museum is a former Alawiyya dynasty era palace and grounds on Rhoda Island on the Nile. It is located in the Sharia Al-Saray area in the El-Manial district of southern Cairo, Egypt. The palace and estate has been preserved as an Antiquities Council directed historic house museum and estate, reflecting the settings and lifestyle of the late 19th- and early 20th-century Egyptian royal prince and heir apparent. The residence compound, composed of five separate and distinctively styled buildings, is surrounded by Persian gardens within an extensive English Landscape garden estate park, along a small branch of the Nile.

History
The Manial Palace was built by Prince Mohammed Ali Tewfik  (1875—1955), the uncle of King Farouk, between 1899 and 1929. He had it designed in a style integrating European Art Nouveau and Rococo with many traditional Islamic architecture styles including Ottoman, Arab Andalusian, Persian, creating inspired combinations in spatial design, architectural and interior decorations, and sumptuous materials.  It housed his extensive art, furniture, clothing, silver and art objects collections, and medieval manuscripts dating back to the Middle Ages. The ceramic tile work of the entryway and the mosque were created by the Armenian ceramist David Ohannessian, originally from Kutahya.

Museum

The Palace, furnishings, and Prince's collections were given to the Egyptian Supreme Council of Antiquities in 1955. The Manial Palace and estate are a public art and history museum, with historical gardens, and forested nature park. There is also Hunting Lodge Museum, that belonged to the late King Farouk.

Prince Muhammad Ali Palace (Manial Palace)

See also
Muhammad Ali Dynasty
Old Cairo - adjacent historic district to east

References

External links
Supreme Council of Antiquities: Manial Palace and Museum website

Museums in Cairo
Gardens in Egypt
Palaces in Cairo
History museums in Egypt
Historic house museums in Africa
Muhammad Ali dynasty
Old Cairo
Art Nouveau architecture in Egypt
Art Nouveau houses
Houses completed in 1929
20th-century architecture in Egypt